Jeffery John Archer Amherst, 5th Earl Amherst MC (13 December 1896 – 4 March 1993), styled Viscount Holmesdale between 1910 and 1927, was a British pilot and airline director.

Amherst was the eldest son of Hugh Amherst, 4th Earl Amherst, by the Honourable Eleanor Clementina St Aubyn, daughter of John St Aubyn, 1st Baron St Levan. He was educated at Eton and the Royal Military College, Sandhurst. He was commissioned into the Coldstream Guards and fought in the First World War, where he was wounded, mentioned in despatches and awarded the Military Cross. He succeeded his father in the earldom in 1927. Amherst worked as a bond salesman with Harris Forbes, as a pilot and airline general manager and was a director of British European Airways. In 1976 he published his autobiography, Wandering Abroad. He was a regular contributor in the House of Lords, making his maiden speech in 1934. His last recorded speech was in February 1985.

Lord Amherst died in March 1993, aged 96. He was unmarried and the earldom became extinct on his death.

References

External links

1896 births
1993 deaths
People educated at Eton College
Graduates of the Royal Military College, Sandhurst
Earls Amherst
Recipients of the Military Cross
British European Airways
British Army personnel of World War I
Coldstream Guards officers